Emily Saïdy de Jongh-Elhage (born 7 December 1946) is a former Curaçaoan politician who served as the 27th prime minister of the Netherlands Antilles from 2006 until its dissolution in 2010. Following the 2010 Curaçao general election she was elected to parliament and served until her retirement in 2012.

Personal background

External links
Onze Kandidaten voor de Eilandsraad Verkiezingen 
BBC Caribbean: Caribbean nationals to flee Lebanon

1946 births
Living people
Prime Ministers of the Netherlands Antilles
Members of the Estates of Curaçao
Party for the Restructured Antilles politicians
Women prime ministers
Curaçao women in politics
21st-century Dutch women politicians
21st-century Dutch politicians